David Vincent Leslie Ames (born 25 June 1989) is an Irish field hockey player, who plays as a defender or midfielder for Oranje-Rood and the England and Great Britain national teams.

He represented Great Britain at the 2016 Summer Olympics and was a member of the England team that won the bronze medal at the 2017 Men's EuroHockey Nations Championship. He also represented England at the 2018 Men's Hockey World Cup.

Club career

Cookstown High School
Ames attended Cookstown High School between 2001 and 2009. Between 2007 and 2009 he captained the Cookstown High School team that won the All Ireland Schoolboys Hockey Championship and two successive Burney Cup/McCullough Cup doubles.  In the 2007–08 Burney Cup final David Ames scored four goals as Cookstown High defeated the Royal and Prior School of Raphoe 6–3 after extra time. In the 2008–09 McCullough Cup final David Ames scored twice as Cookstown High defeated Sullivan Upper School 3–0 in the final. In the 2008–09 Burney Cup final Ames opened the scoring as Cookstown High defeated Banbridge Academy 4–3 in the final.

Cookstown
In 2008–09 Ames was a member of the Cookstown team that played in the Irish Senior Cup final, losing 6–0 to Pembroke Wanderers.

Ulster Elks
Ames played for Ulster Elks at intervarsity level, helping them win the 2009 Mauritius Cup.

Beeston
Between 2010 and 2016 Ames played for Beeston in the Men's England Hockey League Premier Division. He also played for Beeston in the Euro Hockey League In 2015–16 Ames was voted Player's Player of the Year in the Men's English Hockey League.

Holcombe
Between 2016 and 2019 Ames played in the Men's England Hockey League Premier Division for Holcombe.

Oranje-Rood
In April 2021 he signed a 1-year contract at Dutch Hoofdklasse club Oranje-Rood for the 2021–22 season.

International career

Ireland
Between 2008 and 2012, Ames made 64 senior international appearances for Ireland. He was a member of the Ireland team that won the 2011 Men's Hockey Champions Challenge II. He also represented Ireland at the 2009 Men's Hockey World Cup Qualifiers, the 2011 Men's EuroHockey Nations Championship and at a 2012 Men's Field Hockey Olympic Qualifier. In April 2012 Ames made his last appearance for Ireland in a 2–1 away win against Germany. Ames and Ian Sloan both scored for Ireland. In January 2013 Ames and Sloan announced that they were switching allegiances from Ireland to England/Great Britain.

Great Britain
Having previously played for Ireland, Ames had to wait for three years before he was eligible to play for Great Britain. He eventually made his debut for Great Britain in April 2015 in a 3–2 win against Germany in an unofficial international. He made his official debut for Great Britain on 14 May 2015, in a 1–1 draw against Argentina. 
He subsequently represented Great Britain at the 2016 Summer Olympics.

England
Ames has represented England at the 2015 and 2017 Men's EuroHockey Nations Championships, and the 2018 Men's Hockey World Cup.

Field hockey coach
In addition to playing the game, Ames has also worked as a field hockey coach. He was a coach at Repton School between 2010 and 2011. During the 2011–12 season he was the head coach of the Nottingham Trent University first team. Between 2011 and 2017 he was a junior coach at Beeston. Between 2012 and 2015 he was coach of the University of Nottingham first team and in 2015 guided them to an intervarsity title. Since 2012 Ames has worked for MT13, a field hockey coaching company, and since 2013 he has served as a field hockey development officer at Rugby School.

Honours
Ireland
Men's Hockey Champions Challenge II
Winners: 2011
Men's Field Hockey Olympic Qualifier
Runners up: 2012
Beeston
Men's English Hockey League
Winners: 2010–11, 2012–13, 2013–14: 3
Men's Cup Winners
Winners: 2010–11, 2011–12, 2015–16: 3
Ulster Elks
Mauritius Cup
Winners: 2009: 1
Cookstown
Irish Senior Cup
Runners up: 2008–09: 1
Cookstown High School
All Ireland Schoolboys Hockey Championship
Winners: 2007: 1
Burney Cup
Winners: 2007–08, 2008–09: 2
McCullough Cup
Winners: 2007–08, 2008–09: 2

References

External links

1989 births
Living people
Ireland international men's field hockey players
Male field hockey players from Northern Ireland
Irish male field hockey players
British male field hockey players
English male field hockey players
Male field hockey midfielders
Irish field hockey coaches
English field hockey coaches
Field hockey players at the 2016 Summer Olympics
Field hockey players at the 2020 Summer Olympics
2018 Men's Hockey World Cup players
Olympic field hockey players of Great Britain
Men's England Hockey League players
Holcombe Hockey Club players
Beeston Hockey Club players
Sportspeople from County Tyrone
People educated at Cookstown High School
Alumni of Ulster University
HC Oranje-Rood players
Men's Hoofdklasse Hockey players
2023 Men's FIH Hockey World Cup players